A snap election was held in Italy on 13–14 April 2008. The election came after President Giorgio Napolitano dissolved the Italian Parliament on 6 February 2008, following the defeat of the government of Prime Minister Romano Prodi in a January 2008 Senate vote of confidence and the unsuccessful tentative appointment of Franco Marini with the aim to change the current electoral law. Under Italian law, elections must be held within 70 days of the dissolution. The voting determined the leader of Italy's 62nd government since the end of World War II. The coalition led by ex-Prime Minister Silvio Berlusconi from The People of Freedom party defeated that of former Mayor of Rome, Walter Veltroni of the Democratic Party.

Background 

On 24 January 2008 Prime Minister of Italy Romano Prodi lost a vote of confidence in the Senate by a vote of 161 to 156 votes, causing the downfall of his government. Prodi's resignation led President Giorgio Napolitano to request the president of the Senate, Franco Marini, to assess the possibility to form a caretaker government. The other possibility would have been to call for early elections immediately.

The decision of former Minister of Justice Mastella arrived a few days after the confirmation of the Constitutional Court which confirmed the referendum to modify the electoral system. As stated many times by Minister Mastella, if the referendum would have been confirmed this would have led directly to the fall of the government
and it happened. The fall of the government would disrupt a pending election-law referendum that if passed would make it harder for small parties like Mastella's to gain seats in parliament.

UDEUR's defection forced the question of whether Prodi still had the parliamentarian support to govern. Presenting a motion of confidence to parliament, he won relatively easily in the lower house of the Italian Parliament, the Chamber of Deputies, where the coalition's majority was substantial. Yet a win in the upper house – or Senate – seemed unlikely, and President Giorgio Napolitano was said to have warned against going through with the vote.

The vote, held between 3pm and 9pm (CET), was heated and dramatic. During its course the UDEUR party Senator Stefano Cusumano decided to confirm the confidence and to support the prime minister, even against the orders of his party's leader. He was subsequently subjected to the abuse of his colleagues, being called an "hysteric faggot", "traitor", and reportedly spat on by a member of the conservative UDEUR party. At this point Cusumano apparently fainted, and was carried out on a stretcher. Cusumano's defection had no effect, however: Prodi lost the vote with 161 to 156 votes (one member abstained from voting, while three were absent), and promptly handed in his resignation.

On 30 January, Napolitano appointed Franco Marini to try to form a caretaker government with the goal of changing the current electoral system, rather than call a quick election. The state of the electoral system had been under criticism not only within the outgoing government, but also among the opposition and in the general population, because of the impossibility to choose candidates directly and of the risks that a close-call election may not grant a stable majority in the Senate.

On 4 February 2008 Marini acknowledged that he had failed to find the necessary majority for an interim government, and resigned his mandate, after having met with all major political forces and having found opposition to forming an interim government mainly from center-right parties Forza Italia and National Alliance, favoured in a possible next election and strongly in favour of an early vote.,

President Napolitano summoned Bertinotti and Marini, the two speakers of the houses of the Italian parliament, acknowledging the end of the legislature, on 5 February 2008. He dissolved parliament on 6 February 2008.

Campaign 
Major competitors in the election were Silvio Berlusconi, as leader of the centre-right opposition coalition, and Walter Veltroni, leader of the Democratic Party. Berlusconi's right coalition was leading by a significant margin in opinion polls. The 71-year-old Berlusconi, who was twice prime minister—from May 1994 to January 1995 and again from May 2001 to May 2006—was not considered too old for the job though he had had heart surgery since leaving office.

Veltroni's campaign has been compared to Barack Obama's presidential run in the United States. The most apparent of the similarities is his slogan, "Si può fare" (literally, "it can be done").

Following the calling of the election, Veltroni stated his party will not make any alliance in either Chamber, choosing instead to run alone with its own platform, and challenged Berlusconi to do likewise with his Forza Italia party. The main four left-wing parties not part of the PD decided to contest the election together under the banner of The Left – The Rainbow. On 8 February, Berlusconi announced Forza Italia and Gianfranco Fini's National Alliance will run together under the common symbol of The People of Freedom, being regionally allied with the Northern League.

On 13 February, Veltroni announced to have reached an agreement with the Italy of Values, led by Antonio Di Pietro, which agreed for an electoral alliance with the Democratic Party, accepting also to join the Democratic Party parliamentary groups after the election. On 21 February the Italian Radicals announced an agreement with the Democratic Party, accepting to present themselves in list with the latter, under the agreement they will have nine MPs elected in the Parliament, and appointment of Emma Bonino as Minister in case of victory.

Though Berlusconi and Veltroni were in opposite parties, they allegedly represent such similar policies that they were dubbed "Veltrusconi". Both candidates supported big tax cuts and generous spending programs.

The Union of Christian and Centre Democrats was invited to support Berlusconi, but refused and decided to run on its own instead. The Rose for Italy originally planned to run alone with Bruno Tabacci as their PM candidate, but shortly before the filing deadline, they decided to form joint lists with the UDC.

Electoral system 
The electoral system had been last reformed by Law no. 270, 21 December 2005.

Chamber of Deputies 
For the election of the lower house, all seats in the Chamber of Deputies (excluding one deputy for the region of Aosta Valley and twelve deputies for Italians residing abroad) are allocated based on the national vote in a form of party-list proportional representation with a series of thresholds to encourage parties to form coalitions. Voters cast one vote for a closed list, meaning they cannot express a preference for individual candidates.

Parties can choose to run in coalitions. Seats are first allocated based on coalition votes, then divided among parties belonging to the same coalition by the largest remainder method. To guarantee a working majority, the coalition or party that obtains a plurality of the vote, but fewer than 340 seats, is assigned additional seats to reach that number, which is roughly 54% of all seats.

The autonomous region of Aosta Valley elects one deputy through a first-past-the-post system. Italians abroad are divided into four constituencies, which elect a total of twelve seats based on proportional representation.

Senate 

For the election of the upper house, a similar system is used. However, the results are based on regional, rather than national, vote. This means the coalition or party that wins a plurality of votes in each region is guaranteed a majority of the seats assigned to that region. As this mechanism is region-based, opposing parties or coalitions may benefit from the majority bonus in different regions. It therefore does not guarantee any party or coalition a majority in the Senate.

Three regions have exceptions to the system detailed above. In the region of Molise, that is granted two seats in the Senate, seats are allocated proportionally, with no majority bonus. The region of Aosta Valley, which elects one senator, uses a first-past-the-post system. Finally, the region of Trentino-South Tyrol elects seven senators with a mixed-member proportional system: six senators are elected in six single-member constituencies, while the seventh is allocated to the most underrepresented list based on the regional votes.

Six seats in the Senate are assigned to Italians living abroad and are allocated using the same system used for the Chamber of Deputies.

Main coalitions and parties

Coalitions' leaders

Opinion polls

Results

Chamber of Deputies

Overall results

Italy (except Aosta Valley)

Results by region (except Aosta Valley)

Aosta Valley 
The autonomous region of Aosta Valley, in northwestern Italy, elects one member to the Chamber of Deputies through a direct first-past-the-post election. Some parties that formed electoral coalitions in Italy, might have opted to run against one another (or form different coalitions) in this particular region.

Overseas constituencies 
Twelve members of the Chamber of Deputies are elected by Italians abroad. Two members are elected for North America and Central America (including most of the Caribbean), three members for South America (including Trinidad and Tobago), six members for Europe, and one member for the rest of the world (Africa, Asia, Oceania, and Antarctica). Voters in these regions select candidate lists and may also cast a preference vote for individual candidates. The seats are allocated by proportional representation.

The electoral law allows for parties to form different coalitions on the lists abroad, compared to the lists in Italy.

Map

Senate of the Republic

Overall results

Italy (except Aosta Valley and Trentino-Alto Adige)

Aosta Valley

Trentino-Alto Adige/South Tyrol

Overseas constituencies

Results by region

Map

See also 
2008 Italian Senate election, North and Central American division

Notes

References

External links 
 NSD: European Election Database - Italy publishes regional level election data

2008
General election
April 2008 events in Europe